The history of the Jews in Kyiv stretches from the 10th century CE to the 21st century, and forms part of the history of the Jews in Ukraine.

Middle Ages and Renaissance

The first mention of Jews in Kyiv is found in the 10th century Kievian Letter, written by Jews from Cairo in ancient Hebrew. It is the oldest written document to mention the name of the city. Jewish travelers such as Benjamin of Tudela and Pethahiah of Regensburg mentioned the city as one with a large Jewish community. During the Mongol occupation the community was devastated, together with the rest of the city, but the community revived with the acquisition of the city by the Polish–Lithuanian Commonwealth. During Polish–Lithuanian rule, Jews were allowed to settle in the city, but they were subject to several deportations in 1495 and again in 1619.

During the Khmelnytsky Uprising in 1648 most of the Jews in the city were murdered by Zaporozhian Cossacks, along with most of the Jews in Ukraine. After the Russian occupation in 1654, Jews were not allowed to settle in the city. This ban was lifted only in 1793 after the Third Partition of Poland.

Modern history

In the 19th century the Jewish community flourished and the Kyiv community became one of the biggest communities in Ukraine. In 1815, the Jewish population was 1,500, and would continue to grow, reaching over 81,000 nearly one hundred years later in 1913. In that period many synagogues were built including the city's main synagogue, the  Brodsky Choral Synagogue. Jewish schools and workshops were built all around the city.

The community suffered from a number of pogroms in 1882, and again in 1905, when hundreds of Jews were murdered and wounded. The Beilis trial, in which a local Jew, Beilis, was accused of the ritual murder of a child, took place in the city in 1913. Beilis was found innocent.

During the Russian Revolution and the Ukrainian War of Independence the city switched hands several times with new pogroms against the Jews. After the establishment of the Ukrainian SSR the Jewish population grew rapidly and reached approximately 224,000 people in 1939.

At the beginning of the Nazi invasion of the Soviet Union most Jews escaped from the city. The remaining 33,771 Jews were concentrated in Babi Yar, and were executed by shooting on September 29-30th 1941, in an act that became one of the most notorious episodes of the Holocaust. Another 15,000 Jews were murdered in the same place during 1941–1942.

After the war, the surviving Jews returned to the city. On September 4–7, 1945 a pogrom took place and around one hundred Jews were beaten, of whom thirty-six were hospitalized and five died of wounds. 

In 1946, there was only one operating synagogue in Kyiv. The last rabbi to officiate in Kyiv was Rabbi Panets, who retired in 1960 and died in 1968; a new rabbi was not appointed. After the collapse of the Soviet Union in 1991, most of the Jewish population emigrated from Kyiv. After Ukrainian independence, there was a revival of Jewish community life, with the establishment of two Jewish schools and a memorial in Babi Yar, where an official ceremony is held every year.

Today there are approximately 40,000 Jews in Kyiv, with two major religious communities: Chabad (rabbi Jonathan Markovitch); and Karlin. Two major synagogues, the JCC Beit Menachem and the Great Choral Synagogue, serve these communities.

Antisemitism
Kyiv Rabbi Jonathan Markovitch chose to move his daughter's wedding to Israel, fearing that the guests would be victimized in the chaos during the Ukrainian revolution of 2014. The pro-Russian Ukrainians and the Ukraine-government supporters blamed each other for the exacting situation of the Jews of Kyiv, but the leaders of Ukraine's Jewish community judged that recent anti-Semitic provocations in the Crimea, including graffiti on a synagogue in Crimea's capital that read “Death to the Zhids,” were the handiwork of pro-Russian Ukrainians. Rabbi Yaakov Dov Bleich, who presides over Ukraine's Jewish Federation, signed a letter asking Russia to end its aggression, and compared the current climate in Crimea to that of pre-Anschluss Austria. The memorial Menorah in Babi Yar was desecrated twice with a sprayed swastika, during Rosh Hashana and a couple of months later.  During June 2015, there was an explosion in a Jewish-owned shop in Kyiv. An extreme right-wing organization claimed responsibility for the incident. Later that month, the memorial Menorah in Babi Yar was desecrated again.

See also
 Yehupetz

References

External links
Kiev article in the YIVO Encyclopedia of Jews in Eastern Europe

 
Jewish community
Kyiv